Gordon Hunter (born 7 August 1958, in Hawick) is a former Scotland international rugby union player. He played at scrum-half.

Rugby Union career

Amateur career

Hunter went to Edinburgh's Royal High School but never played for Royal HSFP.

He left Edinburgh and played for Selkirk RFC.

Provincial career

He played for South of Scotland District.

He played for the Blues Trial side in 7 January 1984.

He played for Combined Scottish Districts on 1 March 1986 against South of Scotland.

International career

He was capped four times by Scotland 'B' from 1981 to 1984.

He was given four full senior caps for Scotland in the period 1984 to 1985.

He was part of the Scotland squad that won the 1984 Five Nations Championship grand slam.

He played for the Barbarians in 1983.

References

1968 births
Living people
Scottish rugby union players
Rugby union scrum-halves
Scotland international rugby union players
Selkirk RFC players
South of Scotland District (rugby union) players
Scotland 'B' international rugby union players
Blues Trial players
Scottish Districts (combined) players